XHMV-FM is a radio station on 93.9 FM in Hermosillo, Sonora, Mexico. The station is operated by Uniradio and brands as La Zeta with a pop format.

History
XHMV received its concession on August 25, 1987. It was owned by Radiorama through subsidiary Espectáculo Auditivo, S.A.

In 2022, Uniradio reached an agreement to outright purchase XHDM-FM 102.7 from Grupo ACIR, resulting in the migration of La Zeta to that frequency.

References

Radio stations in Sonora
Radio stations established in 1987
1987 establishments in Mexico